Prismism is the debut studio album by Keuning, the solo project of the Killers guitarist Dave Keuning. It was released through his label Pretty Faithful on January 25, 2019. "Restless Legs" was the first single, released on October 12, 2018.

Background
Dave Keuning announced the release of his debut solo album Prismism in October 2018, becoming the last member of the Killers to release a solo or side project. After stepping down from touring with the Killers in August 2017, Keuning began working on song ideas that he had amassed over the past decade, some of which had been pitched to the Killers but ultimately not used by the band. He told Billboard "I didn't drop out of the Killers just to do this (album); It was just going to be too long of a tour for me, but it was nevertheless very refreshing and just felt free and I think I needed this. I don't think I've had this much fun making music in a long, long, long time." He recorded the album at his home in San Diego with producer Brandon Darner, playing most of the instruments himself with contributions on drums from John JR Robinson and Seth Luloff.

Track listing
All tracks produced by Brandon Darner

Adapted from iTunes.

Personnel 
Adapted from liner notes.

Musicians 

 Dave Keuning – bass, keyboards, electronic drums, vocals, guitar
 Brandon Darner – backing vocals (1), acoustic guitar and additional keyboards (3)
 Micah Natera – backing vocals (1), additional keyboards (2, 7), additional guitar (8)
 Homer Rodeheaver – additional vocals (12)
 Ross Vanderwerf – backing vocals (13)
 Mark Stoermer – additional keyboards (9)
 Luke Pettipoole – bass (6)
 Seth Luloff – drums (1, 3, 4, 6, 9, 11), additional programming (4)
 John "J.R." Robinson – drums (2)

Production 

 Brandon Darner – producer
 Micah Natera – engineer, mixer
 Brian B. William – art direction
 Andrew Brightman – A&R
 Fetzer Design – design
 Austin Burns – additional engineer
 James Page – additional engineer
 Robert Root – additional engineer (9)
 Patrick Haney – additional engineer (10, 13)
 Phillip Liddiard – additional engineer (13)
 Doug Van Sloun – mastering at Focus Mastering
 Dana Trippe – photography
 Sergey Kolivayko – additional photography

Critical reception

The album has received several positive reviews with NME describing the record as "vibrant and accomplished", Louder than War called it a "fine record" that "deserves your time."

References

2019 debut albums